Saat Sawal is a 1971 Bollywood adventure film directed by Babubhai Mistry. The film stars Neville Symons and Heena Kumari.

Cast
Naval Kumar as Hatim-Al-Tai 
Heena Kumari as Gulnar Pari / Husna Pari 
Shyam Kumar as Munir Shah
Yusuf Khan as Munir Shah
Johnny Whisky as Ghumroo Aiyar
Sujata as Sabeena   
Jayshree T. as Shahezadi Shalomi
Rajnibala as Dancer / Singer
Manher Desai as 
Master Chintu as Gulnar Pari's brother

Music

External links
 

1971 films
1970s Hindi-language films
1970s adventure films
Films directed by Babubhai Mistry